Sacramento, California, United States, has been an important location in the history of canning thanks to its situation on the intersection of major transportation routes and proximity to large fertile growing areas. Sacramento’s canning industry has prepared a large variety of agricultural products, but is best known for canned tomatoes, earning Sacramento the nickname, "The Big Tomato."

Salmon Packing 

During the Gold Rush era, agriculture was not yet established in California and most food was imported from overseas. Canning in Sacramento began with salmon, which was abundant in the Sacramento and American Rivers. The first industrial-scale salmon cannery in North America was established by the Hapgood-Hume Company in 1864 on a barge in the Sacramento River near West Sacramento. The salmon were packed in salt water (later the salt was replaced with a pickle) and the cans were then boiled for about one hour. Packing companies built twenty salmon canneries over the next two decades, with peak production in 1882 when 200,000 cases were packed. After this peak, there was a dramatic decline in salmon population around Sacramento because of overfishing and loss of habitat due to hydraulic mining, dredge mining, logging,  and the construction of railroads, dams, and water-diversion projects. By 1886 packing companies had closed all their salmon canneries along the Sacramento River and relocated plants north to Oregon, Washington, and Alaska.

Fruit and Vegetable Canning 

With the completion of the transcontinental railroad in 1869 providing access to a national market, Sacramento growers took advantage of the region’s ample water supply and favorable climate and expanded their operations into more profitable fruits and vegetables. In 1870, a railcar could reach Chicago in seven days, but it was still difficult to preserve fresh produce. These circumstances fostered an industry for canning produce, but the nascent canning industry had to compete with the newly invented refrigerated railcar.

The Capitol Packing Company built the first successful fruit and vegetable cannery in Sacramento in 1882 on Front and K Streets. By 1886, the company employed 450 people and produced 100,000 cases per year.

The opening of the Panama Canal in 1914 dramatically increased demand for California canned goods and spurred further development of the industry in the Sacramento area. Numerous cannery operations were built in the Sacramento area around that time.

The success of the canning industry also brought about secondary industries like the mass production of tin cans. The American Can Company formed in 1901, incorporating 123 smaller can companies, and operated manufacturing plants across the United States. In 1926, the company built in Sacramento one of its largest factories, on 33 acres between the American River and McKinley Park.

In 1947, the Campbell Soup Company opened the last major cannery in Sacramento, located on Franklin Boulevard. The plant was Campbell’s oldest facility when it closed in 2013.

Libby, McNeill and Libby Cannery 
In 1912, Libby, McNeill and Libby built one of the largest canneries in California, a nine-acre facility at 31st Street, R Street, and Stockton Boulevard. Strategically situated near a wagon road and the Southern Pacific and Sacramento Northern railroads, fresh produce generally arrived at the cannery by wagon or truck and canned goods left in railroad boxcars. The cannery operations ended in the 1980s, but the complex has been preserved and is listed on the National Register of Historic Places.

California Packing Company 
The California Packing Company, a combination of five West Coast canning companies, best known under the Del Monte brand, opened four canneries in Sacramento: at Front and P Streets, Third and X Streets, 19th and R Streets, and 17th and C Streets. The facility located at 17th and C Streets, known as Plant 11, employed at its peak 2,500 workers and continues in operation, now by the Blue Diamond Growers. Plant 11 is also listed on the National Register of Historic Places.

Bercut-Richards Cannery 

Beginning in 1931, Peter and Henri Bercut and Thomas H. Richards, Sr. developed what became the largest independent cannery in California, located just south of the American River on North 7th Street. Bercut-Richards became one of the largest producers of tomato products, producing their own “Sacramento” brand.

During World War II, Sacramentans grew victory gardens and Bercut-Richards canned the produce with a special “V for Victory” label. In 1942, the U.S. Army Signal Corps took over operation of the Bercut-Richards cannery to supply the war effort. The Bercut-Richards facility housed German prisoners of war who worked in the depot’s warehouses. The Bercut-Richards cannery operations continued until 1993. In 2009, the historic structure was demolished to build apartments and other development.

Cannery Labor 

In the 1800s, white Pacific fisherman organized with cannery workers to exclude non-white workers.

After the first World War, the Industrial Workers of the World and the American Federation of Labor began organizing farm and food production workers throughout California. Between 1918 and 1920, a series of strikes affected cannery operations in Northern California. In 1920, workers at the Libby, McNeill & Libby cannery in Sacramento went on strike.

In Sacramento, the seasonal canning industry was the first industry affected by the Great Depression. In September 1930, the California Cooperative Producers Canning Company (the predecessor operator of Bercut-Richards cannery) laid off 153 cannery workers as demand for canned goods plummeted. The company would eventually owe over $25,000 to 600 workers who filed petitions to the State Labor Bureau but were unsuccessful in recouping their stolen wages. Following a December 1932 freeze, cannery officials began hiring desperate workers for as little as $0.20 an hour  By 1930, the radical Cannery and Agricultural Workers' Industrial Union (CAWIU) was organizing Sacramento cannery workers.

In 1934, pressured by the Associated Farmers of California and its allied urban commercial and industrial interests, police raided the CAWIU headquarters in Sacramento and charged 17 of its leaders with criminal syndicalism. Several leaders, including Pat Chambers and Caroline Decker, were sentenced in 1935 to several years’ imprisonment. After 1935, Sacramento cannery workers organized under the AFL as Cannery Workers Local No. 20324.

In 1945, AFL President William Green turned over jurisdiction of all California cannery locals to the International Brotherhood of Teamsters. Cannery locals in Sacramento, Stockton, and Modesto who hadn't been consulted, hadn't voted, and didn't trust the Teamsters, staged strikes and work stoppages. About 1,200 workers in the Sacramento Libby, McNeill and Libby plant refused to pay dues to the Teamsters, effectively striking with signs that read, “We Will Work—But Not One Cent of Tribute to the Teamsters." The Sacramento Police Department intervened, escorting scab replacements and checking for Teamster cards.

The second World War greatly increased demand for canned goods, but it also reduced the domestic supply of labor. Sacramento canneries benefited from the Bracero Program, which supplemented cheap migrant labor from Mexico. With the Bracero Program, cannery work became increasingly racialized.

After the second World War, cannery operations became increasingly automated and less reliant on labor. Since then, demand for canned goods has steadily declined, resulting in further job losses.

References 

Canneries
History of Sacramento, California
Economic history of California
Labor history of California